AFI's 100 Years... 100 Heroes & Villains is a list of the one hundred greatest screen characters (fifty each in the hero and villain categories) as chosen by the American Film Institute in June 2003. It is part of the AFI 100 Years... series. The list was first presented in a CBS special hosted by Arnold Schwarzenegger. The presentation program was nominated for an Emmy Award for Outstanding Nonfiction Special.

Criteria 
The jurors were limited to feature-length (at least 60 minutes), narrative, English-language films with significant financial and/or creative backing from the United States. All characters, whether hero or villain, were to "have made a mark on American society in matters of style and substance" and "elicit strong reactions across time, enriching America’s film heritage while continuing to inspire contemporary artists and audiences".

The list

Heroes
The AFI defines a hero as "a character(s) who prevails in extreme circumstances and dramatizes a sense of morality, courage and purpose. Though they may be ambiguous or flawed, they often sacrifice themselves to show humanity at its best."

Villains
The AFI defines a Villain as "a character(s) whose wickedness of mind, selfishness of character and will to power are sometimes masked by beauty and nobility, while others may rage unmasked. They can be horribly evil or grandiosely funny but are ultimately tragic."

Notes

References

External links
 AFI's 100 Years...100 Heroes & Villains
 List of the 400 nominated screen characters

AFI 100 Years... series
Lists of film characters
Lists of villains
Lists of fictional heroes
Centennial anniversaries